Schroederella iners is a species of fly in the family Heleomyzidae. It is found in Europe.

References

External links

 

Heleomyzidae
Articles created by Qbugbot
Insects described in 1830
Taxa named by Johann Wilhelm Meigen